Johan Asplund (May 19, 1937 – November 13, 2018) was a Swedish sociologist interested in social interaction and ethnomethodology. At present, his works are not widely translated from the original Swedish. Until his retirement, he held the chair of Sociology at Lund University.

Two of his most widely read books are "Det sociala livets elementära former" (1987, approximately "Elementary forms of social life"), in which he introduces his theory about humans as essentially "socially responsive" (socialt responsiva), and "Essä om Gemeinschaft och Gesellschaft" (1991, "Essay about Gemeinschaft and Gesellschaft"), in which he explains and discusses this concept, originally developed by the German sociologist Ferdinand Tönnies, 1887. Johan Asplund's writings on cities are summarized in English by Bo Gronlund in New Urban Theory.

Bibliography 
 Om mättnadsprocesser 1967
 Sociala egenskapsrymder 1968
 Om undran inför samhället 1970
 Om attitydbegreppets teoretiska status 1971
 En mycket fri tolkning av några teser i George Lukács historia och klassmedvetande 1971
 Inledning till strukturalismen 1973
 Bertillon och Holmes 1976
 Teorier om framtiden 1979
 Socialpsykologiska studier 1980
 Tid, rum, individ och kollektiv 1983
 Ett ostämt piano är hemskt 1984
 Om hälsningsceremonier, mikromakt och asocial pratsamhet 1987
 Det sociala livets elementära former 1987
 Rivaler och syndabockar 1989
 Essä om Gemeinschaft och Gesellschaft 1991 
 Storstäderna och det forteanska livet 1992
 Avhandlingens språkdräkt 2002
 Genom huvudet 2002
 Hur låter åskan? 2003
 Angående Raymond Chandler 2004
 Munnens socialitet och andra essäer 2006
 Ord för ord  2017

Prizes and awards 
 Kellgrenpriset 1997
 John Landquists pris 2003

Notes

1937 births
2018 deaths
Swedish sociologists